The Kaohsiung Confucius Temple is a temple dedicated to the memory of Confucius near Lotus Pond, Zuoying District, in the Taiwanese city of Kaohsiung.

History
The temple was originally constructed in 1684, during the reign of the Kangxi Emperor. However, during the Japanese colonial period, the temple fell into disuse and disrepair. Only the Chongsheng shrine remains intact; it can be seen on the west side of the Old City Elementary School.

A new temple was constructed in 1976, now on the northwest corner of Lotus Pond. The new design was based on Song dynasty architecture, as well as the design of the Temple of Confucius, Qufu.

See also
 Cide Temple
 Chi Ming Palace
 Zuoying Ciji Temple
 Zhouzi Qingshui Temple
 Spring and Autumn Pavilions
 List of temples in Taiwan
 List of tourist attractions in Taiwan

References

1976 establishments in Taiwan
Kaohsiung
Temples in Kaohsiung
Zuoying District